3rd Mounted Brigade may refer to:
3rd (Nottinghamshire and Derbyshire) Mounted Brigade, designation given to the Nottinghamshire and Derbyshire Mounted Brigade while serving with the 2nd Mounted Division in the Gallipoli Campaign
3rd Mounted Brigade (United Kingdom), also known as 2/1st North Midland Mounted Brigade
3rd Mounted Brigade (Canada)